Kowloon Bay is a station on the Hong Kong MTR . The station was opened in 1979.

Kowloon Bay station is one of the five MTR stations on the Kwun Tong line located above ground level, and one of three to be elevated and open-air (the other two being  and ). Due to difficulties in installing platform screen doors (PSDs) in above ground stations, the MTR decided not to install PSDs in this station, instead installing automatic platform gates (APGs) on the station's platforms in 2011. In 2011, the MTR also changed the hue of Kowloon Bay station from black to red.

The headquarters of the MTR Corporation and the depot for the Kwun Tong line are both located at this station. Also located above the depot is Telford Gardens, the first residential property to be developed by the MTR Corporation. Kowloon Bay station is connected to Telford Plaza, a shopping mall located next to Telford Gardens.

History 
Kowloon Bay station was opened when Modified Initial System was opened on 1 October 1979.

Station layout 

Platforms 1 and 2 share the same island platform.

Entrances/exits 

A: MTR Headquarters Building 
B: Amoy Gardens  
C: Telford Plaza

Gallery

References 

MTR stations in Kowloon
Kwun Tong line
Kowloon Bay
Ngau Tau Kok
Railway stations in Hong Kong opened in 1979